St Paul as a surname may refer to:

Francis St. Paul (born 1979), American football wide receiver 
George St Paul (1562–1613), English politician
Henry St Paul (1777–1820), English soldier and politician
Horace St Paul (1775–1840), English soldier and Member of Parliament
John St. Paul (1867–1939), Justice of the Louisiana Supreme Court